The 1892 University of Utah football season represented the University of Utah as an independent during the 1892 college football season. This was the school's first season of intercollegiate football. The team played three games and compiled a 1–2 record. However, only one game counts in official NCAA records. Utah lost to Utah Agricultural, 12–0, in the first game of what is now known as the Battle of the Brothers.

Schedule

References

University of Utah
Utah Utes football seasons
College football winless seasons
University of Utah football